Șoltuz is a Romanian-language surname. It is an occupational surname ultimately derived from the German title of  "Schultheiß". Notable people with the surname include:

George Șoltuz (born  1977), former Romanian football player
Nicolae Șoltuz (1864-1940), Bessarabian politician

See also

Romanian-language surnames
Occupational surnames